Doug Thorley was an American Funny Car drag racer, hot rodder and businessman. In 1967, he won the NHRA Nationals' first Funny Car Eliminator title, and was given Car Crafts All-Star Drag Racing Team Funny Car Driver of the Year Award in 1968. Hot Rod magazine describes him as "one of drag racing's most famous early era drivers."

Racing career 
Thorley won many drag races at the Santa Ana (California) strip in the 1950s in a 1938 Century coupe. In the 1960s, he was the first in class to break 200 miles per hour at the Bonneville Salt Flats in a C/Modified Sports Corvette. In 1964, Thorley match raced an altered-wheelbase (pre-Funny Car)  injected big-block 1964 Chevy II he called Chevy Too Much. 

Thorley's Doug's Headers Corvair was the first seven-second Funny Car, and it was in this car he won the NHRA supercharged A Funny Car (AA/FC) class at Indianapolis Raceway Park in 1967, defeating Joe Lunati's The Dixie Devil Camaro. It was the first time Funny Car Eliminator was held at Indy. Indy would also prove to be Thorley's only NHRA national event win in Funny Car.

That year 1967, he would also record the first (unofficial)  funny car pass in his Corvair, at Lions Drag Strip.

In 1968, Thorley bought a rear-engined AMC 401-powered Javelin TF/FC (one of just a handful of similar funny cars ever built, including Dave Bowman's California Stud) from Woody Gilmore. (The  would later be replaced by a  hemi prepared by John Hoven and Glenn Okazaki.) The same year, he was given Car Crafts All-Star Drag Racing Team Funny Car Driver of the Year Award in 1968.

Doug Thorley Headers 
Thorley founded his header company in 1958. Among Thorley's better-known customers were Carol Cox (through her husband, who Thorley was friends with). Thorley headers would go on to be a favorite among drag racers.

Thorley Headers is a leading producer of headers and exhaust systems, favored by many rodders and racers.

Biography
Thorley is the subject of the book Doug Thorley: Headers by Doug written by Don Pennington.

Thorley died March 10, 2021, at his home in New Harmony, Utah at age 92.

Notes

Sources

McClurg, Bob.  "50 Years of Funny Cars:  Part 2" in Drag Racer, November 2016, pp. 35–50.
McClurg, Bob. The History of AMC Motorsports.  Forest Lake, Minnesota:  CarTech, Inc, 2016
Taylor, Thom.  "Beauty Beyond the Twilight Zone" in Hot Rod, April 2017, pp. 30–43.

Further reading 
Boyce, Doug. 1001 Drag RAcing FActs at Google Books.
Boyce, Doug. Match Race Mayhem at Google Books.
Engel, Lyle. The Complete Book of Fuel and Gas Dragsters. Four Winds Press, 1968.
Pennington, Don. Doug Thorley: Headers by Doug. CreateSpace Independent Publishing Platform, Apr. 23, 2013.

External links 
Hot Rodders.com
Hagerty
Hot Rod

Dragster drivers
American racing drivers
1967 in motorsport
20th-century American businesspeople
21st-century American businesspeople